The Lapland longspur (Calcarius lapponicus), also known as the Lapland bunting, is a passerine bird in the longspur family Calcariidae, a group separated by most modern authors from the Fringillidae (Old World finches).

Etymology
The English name refers to the long hind claws. The genus name Calcarius is from Latin calcaria, "spurs", and the specific lapponicus refers to Lapland.

Description
The Lapland longspur is a robust bird, with a thick yellow seed-eater's bill. The summer male has a black head and throat, white eyestripe, chestnut nape, white underparts, and a heavily streaked black-grey back. Other plumages have a plainer orange-brown head, a browner back and chestnut nape and wing panels.

Measurements:

 Length: 5.9-6.3 in (15-16 cm)
 Weight: 0.8-1.2 oz (22.3-33.1 g)
 Wingspan: 8.7-11.4 in (22-29 cm)

Distribution and habitat
It breeds across Arctic Europe and the Palearctic and in Canada and the northernmost United States. It is migratory, wintering in the Russian steppes, the southern United States, Northern Scandinavian arctic areas and down to coastal Southern Sweden, Denmark and Great Britain. This is the only Asian species of the longspur buntings, and while it probably did not evolve there, it has been present in Eastern Europe for at least about 30,000 years.

Behaviour

Call
The most common flight call is a hard "prrrrt" usually preceded by a more nasal "teeww". When breeding, it also makes a softer "duyyeee" followed by a pause and a "triiiuuu"; both sounds alternate.

Breeding
It breeds in wet areas with birch or willow, and or bare mountains, and winters on cultivated land or coasts. The bird is often seen close to the tree line, and likes to feed in mixed-species flocks in winter. Its natural food consists of insects when feeding young, and otherwise seeds. The nest is on the ground. 2–4 eggs are laid.

Food habits

The food habits of the Lapland longspur are quite simple: mostly seeds in winter and arthropods in the summer, when they are in activity.

During the winter, the longspur feeds on seeds. They pick them on the ground, rarely feeding directly on plants. They will forage around the same area for a period varying between a few minutes and an hour, then fly away looking for a new foraging area. Their seed diet is composed mainly of seeds from grass, foxtail, cultivated millet, crabgrass and wheat. During the breeding season, the birds migrate to the north, where their diet switches to arthropods. Nestlings are only fed arthropods, which also constitute the diet of the parents at that time of the year (June to July). The birds often catch insects in mid-air, but do forage through vegetation when climatic conditions prevent the insects from flying. Longspurs can consume between 3000 and 10,000 prey items (insects or seeds) per day, depending on their energy needs ; they may need to increase this number by 3000 when feeding the young. Dipteran larvae and adults form the major part of their insectivorous diet.

Gallery

References

External links

 
 Lapland Longspur Species Account - Cornell Lab of Ornithology
 Lapland Longspur - Calcarius lapponicus - USGS Patuxent Bird Identification InfoCenter
 
 Stamps (for Canada) with Circumpolar Range-Map at bird-stamps.org
 
 Lapland Longspur images at Oriental Bird Images - A Database of the Oriental Bird Club (see pulldown menu at page bottom)
 

Lapland longspur
Birds of the Arctic
Birds of Scandinavia
Holarctic birds
Lapland longspur
Taxa named by Carl Linnaeus